Mame Birame Mangane (born 19 November 1969) is a Senegalese footballer. He played in seven matches for the Senegal national football team in 1993 and 1994. He was also named in Senegal's squad for the 1994 African Cup of Nations tournament.

References

1969 births
Living people
Senegalese footballers
Senegal international footballers
1994 African Cup of Nations players
Place of birth missing (living people)
Association footballers not categorized by position